Chini is a village in Sadat Rural District, in the Central District of Lali County, Khuzestan Province, Iran.

Chini may also refer to:
 Chini (film), a 2016 Indian film
 Chini (letter), a letter in three Georgian scripts
 Chini (reservoir), Melfa, Ethiopia
 Chini (state constituency), Pahang, Malaysia
 Chini Lake, Pekan District, Pahang, Malaysia
 Chini language or Akrukay, Papua New Guinea
 Chini Mosque, in Saidpur, Bangladesh

See also

Chiki
 Cini (disambiguation)